Kiril Dimitrov (born 21 January 1985) is a Bulgarian footballer who is currently playing with Scarborough SC in the Canadian Soccer League. Aside from being an active player he also serves as the general manager for Scarborough SC.

Playing career 
Dimitrov began his career in 2004 with Makedonska Slava and later played with PFC Pirin Blagoevgrad and FC Septemvri Simitli. In 2007, he played in the Bulgarian A Football Group with PFC Belasitsa Petrich. He played with the club for two seasons. After Belasitsa was relegated to the Bulgarian B Professional Football Group he went overseas to Canada to sign with the Serbian White Eagles of the Canadian Soccer League. He made his debut for the club on 22 May 2009 in a match against Portugal FC. During his tenure with the White Eagles, he managed to achieve an International division title and reached the CSL Championship finals. 

In 2014, he signed with SC Waterloo Region and secured a postseason berth with the club. In 2015, he was appointed a general manager to expansion franchise Scarborough SC. He contributed to the development of the club by serving as a player-coach and negotiating player contracts. In the club's debut season the team finished tenth in the overall standings and missed the final postseason berth by a goal difference. 

In 2018, he played in League1 Ontario with Unionville Milliken SC. For the 2019 seasons, he played with Master's FA, ProStars FC and Aurora FC. In 2021, he assisted Scarborough in securing the CSL Championship against FC Vorkuta in the playoffs.

Honours

Serbian White Eagles 
Canadian Soccer League International Division: 2009

References 

1985 births
Living people
Bulgarian footballers
Bulgarian football managers
PFC Pirin Blagoevgrad players
FC Septemvri Simitli players
PFC Belasitsa Petrich players
Serbian White Eagles FC players
SC Waterloo Region players
First Professional Football League (Bulgaria) players
Canadian Soccer League (1998–present) players
Scarborough SC players
Canadian Soccer League (1998–present) managers
Association football midfielders
Unionville Milliken SC players
Aurora FC (Canada) players
ProStars FC players
Second Professional Football League (Bulgaria) players
Master's FA players
League1 Ontario players